Georgi Petrov (born 17 September 1954) is a Bulgarian judoka. He competed at the 1980 Summer Olympics and the 1988 Summer Olympics.

References

1954 births
Living people
Bulgarian male judoka
Olympic judoka of Bulgaria
Judoka at the 1980 Summer Olympics
Judoka at the 1988 Summer Olympics
People from Montana, Bulgaria
20th-century Bulgarian people